American actor and producer Michael Douglas began his film career with a brief uncredited role in Cast a Giant Shadow (1966). In the same year he played a small role in the play Bedford Forrest. His performance in Hail, Hero! (1969) earned him a nomination for the Golden Globe Award for Most Promising Male Newcomer. He won the 1971 Theatre World Award for Pinkville. During 1972–76, he played the lead role in the TV series The Streets of San Francisco. In 1975, Douglas produced One Flew Over the Cuckoo's Nest which won the Academy Award for Best Picture, Golden Globe for Best Picture and BAFTA Award for Best Film.

Douglas' role of Gordon Gekko in Oliver Stone's Wall Street (1987) won him the Academy Award for Best Actor. For his portrayal of a fictional American president in the 1995 comedy The American President, he was nominated for Golden Globe Award for Best Actor – Motion Picture Musical or Comedy. His performance in Wonder Boys (2000) earned him nominations for the BAFTA Award for Best Actor in a Leading Role and Golden Globe Award for Best Actor – Motion Picture Drama.

He shared the Screen Actors Guild Award for Outstanding Performance by a Cast in a Motion Picture with his co-actors in Traffic (2000). He reprised the role of Gekko in Wall Street: Money Never Sleeps (2010) and was nominated for the Golden Globe Award for Best Supporting Actor – Motion Picture for the same. Douglas' portrayal of Liberace in Behind the Candelabra (2013) earned him the Primetime Emmy Award for Outstanding Lead Actor in a Miniseries or a Movie.

For his contributions to the film industry, Douglas won the 2004 Golden Globe Cecil B. DeMille Award and the 2009 AFI Life Achievement Award.

Stage

Film

Feature film

Documentary and short film

Television

Music video

See also
 List of awards and nominations received by Michael Douglas

References

Bibliography

External links
 
 

Male actor filmographies
American filmographies
Stage And Screen